Busung Biu is a district (kecamatan) in the regency of Buleleng in northern Bali, Indonesia. The Balinese government has been active in the district to increase village connectivity and was evaluated on April 11, 2007, in the village of Umejero.

References

Districts of Bali